Movin'! is a studio album by Kay Starr. It was released in 1959 by Capitol Records (catalog no. T-1254). Produced by Dave Cavanaugh, it was her first album after returning to Capitol. While RCA Victor had her singing material with a pop orientation, the liner notes assert Capitol's intention to "reaffirm her status as a great jazz vocalist." She was backed on the album by an orchestra conducted by Van Alexander and a big band.

AllMusic gave the album a rating of three stars. Reviewer Greg Adams wrote that the album "delivers pure big band and traditional pop music with a swingin' beat and Starr's soulful phrasing."

Track listing
Side A
 "On a Slow Boat to China" 
 "I Cover the Waterfront"
 "Around the World"
 "Sentimental Journey"
 "Night Train"
 "Riders in the Sky"

Side B
 "Goin' to Chicago Blues"
 "Indiana"
 "Song of the Wanderer"
 "Swingin' Down the Lane"
 "Lazy River"
 "Movin'"

References

1959 albums
Kay Starr albums
Capitol Records albums